The Sicilian Regiment (also known as The Royal Sicilian Regiment of Foot) was a light infantry regiment recruited from Sicily that served with the British Army during the Napoleonic wars, from 1806 to its disbandment in 1816.

The Detachment of Royal Sicilian Volunteers
At first, the unit was only a detachment of volunteers, raised in Sicily by Major General Sir John Stuart, once he had obtained permission from King Ferdinand I to recruit troops in Messina. This detachment, like several other foreign corps in British pay, was to be recruited from locals for the rank and file, with British officers.

The detachment first experienced action within two months of its creation, when a small party (2 officers and 58 other ranks) at the Battle of Maida on 4 July 4, 1806. With two companies of the Royal Corsican Rangers, they were assigned to the light brigade commanded by Colonel James Kempt. After this victorious first mission the detachment returned to Messina.

The following year, in March 1807, the Royal Sicilian Volunteers embarked for Constantinople in the mission led by General Alexander Mackenzie Fraser. This was later diverted to the Alexandria expedition of 1807. During this ill-fated mission the unit, now commanded by Colonel John Coape Sherbrooke, defended the Citadel of Qaitbay (which was nicknamed "the Cut"). After the end of the expedition, they returned to Messina and were allowed to resume recruiting troops. By this time, the regiment was made of ten companies, with two more being added in 1808. They were then sent to Malta to reinforce the garrison.

The Royal Sicilian Regiment of Foot
in 1808 the detachment of volunteers was raised to a proper regiment and issued its own set of regimental orders. At a ceremony at Floriana Barracks, Malta, on 2 March 1809, they were also presented with their regimental colours (a white flag with a black flying eagle, crowned, bearing an escutcheon with the three fleurs-de-lys of the Bourbon dynasty) by General Sir Hildebrand Oakes, commander of the British forces in Malta. The Regiment remained in Malta under Colonel Ronald C. Ferguson, who was appointed to command the regiment on 25 January 1809.

At this point, each company of the regiment was formed as follows: 
 4 officers
 6 sergeants
 5 corporals
 4 acting corporals 
 1 artisan
 10 carabiniers (elite sharpshooters armed with rifles and sword bayonets)
 2 buglers
 68 privates 

In 1814, the Sicilian Regiment took over the island of Ponza and then participated in the capture of the island of Corfu. During its stay in garrison at Malta, the regiment distinguished itself for the management of the terrible plague of that year, being highly praised for it by Governor Thomas Maitland. The following year the Regiment was to be called back to Britain, but Napoleon's escape from Elba prevented it, and the Sicilian Regiment was called on to fight Joachim Murat in Italy.

The regiment was finally disbanded on March 24, 1816, as were many other foreign regiments in the British Army, such as the King's German Legion.

Uniform
In 1810 the Sicilian Regiment wore the scarlet British infantry coat with dark green facings, collar and cuffs, white lace, stovepipe shako with bugle badge (which may later have been replaced by a Tarleton helmet) with a green plume, white breeches and black 3/4 gaiters. Officers' "metal" was gold, with golden buttons with the royal crown and the words "Sicilian Regiment" around it.

Colonels
 John Coape Sherbrooke. appointed February 5, 1807
 Ronald C. Ferguson, appointed January 25, 1809

Footnotes

References
Army List, foreign corps.
Ordini permanent per il Reggimento Siciliano di fanteria leggiera, nel servizio di Sua Maesta' Britannica, Malta 1808 (1st ed.) and 1813 (2nd ed.). 
B. Burnham - R. McGuigan, The British Army Against Napoleon: Facts, Lists and Trivia, 1805-1815, Barnsley 2010.
R. Chartrand - P. Courcelle, Emigré and Foreign Troops in British Service (2), 1803-15 (Osprey Military - Men at arms Series n. 335), Oxford 2000, p. 38 and plate D.
D. Fosten - B. Marrion, The Sicilian Regiment, Military Modelling, November 1990.
A. Pigeard, Le Regiment Sicilien, Tradition Magazine n° 170, September 2001.
 Darmanin, D., "Malta-based Sicilian Regiment that served His Royal Highness", Times of Malta, 14 November 2015.

External links
Regiments of the Malta Garrison: Sicilian
His Britannic Majesty's Sicilian Regiment (in Italian)
Original Undress coat of His Majesty's Sicilian Regiment

See also
British Army during the Napoleonic Wars
The United Kingdom in the Napoleonic Wars
Types of military forces in the Napoleonic Wars

Military units and formations disestablished in 1816
Regiments of the British Army
Military units and formations of the United Kingdom in the Peninsular War
19th-century military history of the United Kingdom
Military history of Sicily
British military units and formations of the Napoleonic Wars